Tonsilla is a genus of East Asian funnel weavers first described by J. F. Wang & C. M. Yin in 1992.

Species
 it contains nineteen species:
Tonsilla defossa Xu & Li, 2006 — China
Tonsilla distalis Zhang, Zhu & Wang, 2017 — China
Tonsilla eburniformis Wang & Yin, 1992 — China
Tonsilla jinggangensis Liu & Xu, 2020 — China
Tonsilla jinyunensis M. Zhang, Irfan, Wang & Z. S. Zhang, 2022 — China
Tonsilla jiugongensis M. Zhang, Irfan, Wang & Z. S. Zhang, 2022 — China
Tonsilla lyrata (Wang, Yin, Peng & Xie, 1990) — China
Tonsilla makros Wang, 2003 — China
Tonsilla mopanensis Zhang, Zhu & Wang, 2017 — China
Tonsilla rostrum Jiang, Chen & Zhang, 2018 — China
Tonsilla rutunda M. Zhang, Irfan, Wang & Z. S. Zhang, 2022 — China
Tonsilla shuikouensis K. Liu, J. Liu & Xu, 2021 — China
Tonsilla subrostrum M. Zhang, Irfan, Wang & Z. S. Zhang, 2022 — China
Tonsilla subtruculenta M. Zhang, Irfan, Wang & Z. S. Zhang, 2022 — China
Tonsilla tautispina (Wang, Yin, Peng & Xie, 1990) — China
Tonsilla truculenta Wang & Yin, 1992 — China
Tonsilla variegata (Wang, Yin, Peng & Xie, 1990) — China
Tonsilla yanlingensis (Zhang, Yin & Kim, 2000) — China
Tonsilla yueliangensis M. Zhang, Irfan, Wang & Z. S. Zhang, 2022 — China

References

Agelenidae
Araneomorphae genera